Peter Wallenstein is an author and professor of History at Virginia Tech.

Education
Wallenstein received a bachelor's degree in History from Columbia University in 1966 and a Doctorate in History from Johns Hopkins University in 1973.

Areas of Specialization
He specializes in History of the U.S. South, Virginia, civil rights, and higher education.  He is currently researching in the areas of Segregation, Desegregation, and the University of North Carolina.

Honors
Wallenstein has received numerous awards for teaching.  He received the Virginia Tech Diggs Teaching Scholar Award for 2005–06 for his work with undergraduates on research projects.   He was also named to the Organization of American Historians’ Distinguished Lectureship Program (2005). He received Hughes the Gossett Prize from the Supreme Court Historical Society for the best article published in the Journal of Supreme Court History in 2004, for “To Sit or Not to Sit: The Supreme Court of the United States and the Civil Rights Movement in the Upper South.”  In 2004, he received the Sturm Award for Excellence in Faculty Research, from the Virginia Tech chapter of Phi Beta Kappa, for his book, "Tell the Court I Love My Wife (2002) and Blue Laws and Black Codes".  He also received the 2004 Scholar Award in History, from the Virginia Social Science Association.

Bibliography
 "From Slave South to New South: Public Policy in Nineteenth-Century Georgia (Fred W Morrison Series in Southern Studies)" May 1987 
 "Virginia Tech, Land-Grant University, 1872-1997: History of a School, a State, a Nation" Oct 1997 
 "The Encyclopedia of American Political History" March 2001, 
 "Tell the Court I Love My Wife: Race, Marriage, and Law--An American History" January 2004 
 "Blue Laws and Black Codes: Conflict, Courts, and Change in Twentieth-Century Virginia" April 2004 
 "Virginia's Civil War" January 2005 
 "Cradle of America: Four Centuries of Virginia History" March 2007 
 "Higher Education and the Civil Rights Movement: White Supremacy, Black Southerners, and College Campuses."    Gainesville: University of Florida Press, 2008.

References

Virginia Tech faculty
Living people
American male writers
Year of birth missing (living people)